Wellington Square is a garden square in central Oxford, England, a continuation northwards of St John Street. In the centre of the square is a small park, Wellington Square Gardens, owned by the University of Oxford. A bicycle route passes into Little Clarendon Street through the pedestrian area at the front of the University Offices in the north-east of the square.

The street name is used to refer metonymically to the central administration of the University of Oxford, which in 1975 moved from the Clarendon Building to new buildings with an address in the square but built at that time, along with graduate student accommodation, along the adjacent Little Clarendon Street.

The university's Department for Continuing Education is in the square in Rewley House, which was designed in 1872 by the Oxford architect E.G. Bruton, who also laid out the square. This was the initial location of Kellogg College. Number 47 houses the administrative offices of the Faculty of Medieval and Modern Languages, as well as the university's Slavic and Modern Greek collections. Barnett House (named after the social reformer Canon Samuel Barnett and his wife Henrietta), home of the Department of Social Policy and Intervention is found along one side of the square.

The Oxford University Broadcasting Society used a studio of Radio Oxford in the square.

References

Squares in Oxford
Parks and open spaces in Oxford
Kellogg College, Oxford